Marcos Rodolfo Bisonó Haza is a Dominican businessman and lawyer. Bisonó is currently the President of Asociación Dominicana de la Industria del Cigarrillo (ASOCIGAR).

Early life 
Marcos Bisonó was born in Santo Domingo, and is the son of architect Victor Bisonó Pichardo, born into a prominent family from Villa Bisonó in the foothills of the Northern Mountain-Range in Santiago Province, and Ivonne Haza, a renowned national soprano from San Pedro de Macorís. He completed elemental school at Colegio Santa Teresita and graduated cum laude as Juris Doctor from the Universidad Iberoamericana’s Law School. He also completed some courses at the Lawyers Yale School of Management.

Bisonó is descended from Domingo Daniel Pichardo, Vice President of the Dominican Republic from 1857 to 1858, and Fernando Valerio, who is considered a hero of the Battle of Santiago (1844).

Ancestors

Notes

References

External links 
 "Marcos Bisonó Haza". Oficina Bisonó: Abogados & Notarios.
 "Marcos Bisonó". Martindale.com

Living people
1965 births
People from Santo Domingo
Dominican Republic businesspeople
20th-century Dominican Republic lawyers
Dominican Republic people of Basque descent
Dominican Republic people of Canarian descent
Dominican Republic people of French descent
Dominican Republic people of Spanish descent
Dominican Republic people of Cuban descent
White Dominicans